Abancay is a city in southern-central Peru.

Abancay may also refer to:

Abancay Province, a province in the Apurímac Region
Abancay District, a district in the Abancay province